#WalangForever is a 2015 Filipino romantic comedy film starring Jennylyn Mercado and Jericho Rosales. It is an official entry to the 2015 Metro Manila Film Festival and was shown on December 25, 2015.

JM de Guzman was supposed to be the lead actor opposite Mercado but pulled out of the film due to personal problems. This is Mercado's seventh MMFF entry after her 2014 award-winning film entry, English Only, Please.

Synopsis
Mia, a celebrated writer of romantic-comedy films, is at a turning point in her life which makes it difficult for her to believe that love could last. Everything comes to a head when Ethan returns, only for her to find out that he has become a cynic of lasting love because she broke his heart.

Cast

Main cast
 Jericho Rosales as Ethan Isaac
 Jennylyn Mercado as Mia Nolasco-Isaac

Supporting cast

 Kim Molina as Luli
 Lorna Tolentino as Betchay Nolasco
 Phoemela Baranda; cameo appearance
 Sebastian Castro; cameo appearance
 Jerald Napoles as Tonypet
 Jane Oineza; cameo appearance
 Khalil Ramos; cameo appearance
 Jon Lucas; cameo appearance
 Michelle Vito; cameo appearance
 Yves Flores; cameo appearance
 Matet de Leon; cameo appearance
 Melai Cantiveros; cameo appearance
 Jason Francisco; cameo appearance
 Julian Estrada; cameo appearance
 Sofia Andres; cameo appearance
 Sid Lucero; cameo appearance
 Liza Diño; cameo appearance
 Maja Salvador; cameo appearance
 Derek Ramsay; cameo appearance
 Patrick Sugui; cameo appearance
 Cai Cortez; cameo appearance
 Nico Antonio; cameo appearance

Extended cast
 Cathy Garcia-Molina as herself
 Carlo Aquino
 Rustica Carpio
 Irma Adlawan
 Alynna Asistio
 Juan Miguel Severo
 Myke Salomon (DJ Myke)

Production
Scenes were shot in Taiwan.

Awards

References

External links
 

2015 films
2015 romantic comedy films
Philippine romantic comedy films
Films set in Taiwan
Films shot in Taiwan